Bjørnøya is a populated island in Ålesund Municipality in Møre og Romsdal county, Norway. It lies in the Vigrafjorden, between the island of Vigra to the west and the Norwegian mainland to the east. It is connected to the Norwegian mainland through a man-made causeway. The nearest larger village on the mainland is Søvik. To the east of the Bjørnøya (between Bjørnøya and Søvik) lies the island of Terøya. The two islands are separated by the Bjørnøysundet. The island was part of the former municipality of Borgund until 1965 when it joined Haram Municipality.  In 2020, it became part of Ålesund Municipality.

There are several hamlets on the island, the notable ones among them are Bjørnøya and Fagerheim. The children on the island are served by the school in Søvik, just  to the southeast.

A marked path leads up to the top. Other attractions on the island include the Bjørnøya coastal fort (Bjørnøya Kystfort) in the south. There are also beaches, forests, and wetlands (Tangane) in the northeast part of the island. The municipality of Haram had plans to develop two preserves on the island: one preserving shores and the other preserving the wetlands.

References

External links
Visit of the Bjørnøya coastal Fjord 
Visit of the Bjørnøya highpoint 
Visit of Bjørnøya's coast
Article on the crabs of Bjørnøya 

Ålesund
Islands of Møre og Romsdal